The Solomons cuckooshrike,  Solomon cicadabird or black-bellied cicadabird (Edolisoma holopolium) is a species of bird in the family Campephagidae.
It is found in the Solomon Islands archipelago.
Its natural habitat is subtropical or tropical moist lowland forests.
It is threatened by habitat loss.

References

Solomons cuckooshrike
Birds of Bougainville Island
Birds of the Solomon Islands
Solomons cuckooshrike
Taxonomy articles created by Polbot